Carlos Reybaud (born 31 October 1949) is a former Argentine cyclist. He competed in the sprint event at the 1972 Summer Olympics.

References

External links
 

1949 births
Living people
Argentine male cyclists
Olympic cyclists of Argentina
Cyclists at the 1972 Summer Olympics
Place of birth missing (living people)